This article summarises results for the general elections to the Australian House of Representatives and Senate, respectively the lower and upper houses of Australia's federal bicameral legislative body, the Parliament of Australia. The number of seats has increased steadily over time, from 111 for the first election, to the current total of 227. The current federal government structure was established in 1901 by the Commonwealth of Australia Constitution Act, 1901.

Two groups have dominated politics in Australia: Labor and the Coalition, composed of the Liberal Party and the National Party (formerly the Country Party). Since the foundation of the Liberal Party in 1944, every government has been formed either by the Coalition or by the Labor Party.

Although government has been a two-party system, since 1955 Australians have consistently elected Senators from multiple parties. In the 1955 election one DLP candidate was elected (under the ALP-AC banner). Although the DLP ceased to be a force after Gough Whitlam took power in 1972, the Liberal Movement and its successor the Australian Democrats carved out their own niche. In the 1980s the NDP briefly gained election, and in the 1990s the Greens were elected to the Senate.

By 2007, the Democrats' federal parliamentary representation had disappeared, while the Greens have emerged at the national level to take their place. The Nationals' representation has also steadily declined, with their percentage of the vote hitting new lows. With the high-profile defection of Senator Julian McGauran to the Liberals in 2006, questions have been raised about the Nationals' viability, and proposals for a Liberal-National party merger have increased in strength. More recently various smaller parties or microparties are represented.

Summary of results

House of Representatives
The total for the party forming government after the election is bolded. Parties that have never formed government are listed under "Others".

House of Representatives primary, two-party and seat results 
A two-party system has existed in the Australian House of Representatives since the two non-Labor parties merged in 1909. The 1910 election was the first to elect a majority government, with the Australian Labor Party concurrently winning the first Senate majority. Prior to 1909 a three-party system existed in the chamber. A two-party-preferred vote (2PP) has been calculated since the 1919 change from first-past-the-post to preferential voting and subsequent introduction of the Coalition. ALP = Australian Labor Party, L+NP = grouping of Liberal/National/LNP/CLP Coalition parties (and predecessors), Oth = other parties and independents.

Historical party composition of the Senate
The Senate has included representatives from a range of political parties, including several parties that have seldom or never had representation in the House of Representatives, but which have consistently secured a small but significant level of electoral support, as the table shows.

Results represent the composition of the Senate after the elections. The full Senate has been contested on eight occasions; the inaugural election and seven double dissolutions.  These are underlined and highlighted in puce.

See also
Chronology of Australian federal parliaments
Timeline of Australian elections
Elections in Australia
List of political parties in Australia
List of Australian federal by-elections
2013 Australian federal election

Notes

References
 

 
Federal